Elizabeth Anne Brown (15 November 1956 – 17 November 2013) was a New Zealand-born Australian bryologist who primarily contributed to the systematics of liverworts.

Early life and education
Brown was born in Auckland, New Zealand, on 15 November 1956. Her father, John Brown (1928–2005), was a lecturer of plant physiology at the University of Auckland and a Test cricket umpire. Her mother was Barbara Brown (1929–1998). After attending Epsom Girls' Grammar School, she went on to study at the University of Auckland between 1975 and 1987. Her Master's and doctoral research, under the supervision of Dr John Braggins, focused on the systematics of the liverwort genera Marchantia and Riccardia, respectively. The title of her 1987 doctoral thesis was Studies in the New Zealand Aneuraceae.

Career and later life
In 1989, Brown moved to New South Wales, Australia, to undertake a research fellowship at the National Herbarium of New South Wales. In 1993, she was appointed as a scientific officer, and later as systematic bryologist in 2000. Brown was also a lecturer at both the University of New England and the University of Sydney. Additionally, she was an editor for the plant systematics journal Telopea.

Brown described several species of plant, including those from the Dracophyllum, Lissanthe, and Riccardia genera.

Brown died of liver cancer on 17 November 2013 at Tahmoor, New South Wales, at the age of 57.

Selected works

Theses

Journal articles

References

20th-century Australian botanists
1956 births
2013 deaths
New Zealand emigrants to Australia
University of Auckland alumni
People educated at Epsom Girls' Grammar School
Scientists from Auckland
21st-century Australian botanists
20th-century Australian women scientists